The Wey South Path is a Long Distance Path in Surrey and West Sussex, England. For part of its 32-mile route it follows the banks of the River Wey and of the Wey and Arun Canal.

The route
Guildford
Stonebridge
Bramley
Run Common
Elmbridge
Fast Bridge
The Three Compasses
Highbridge
Loxwood
Drungewick Lane
Newbridge
Harsfold
Stopham
Greatham
Houghton Bridge

See also
Long-distance footpaths in the UK

References

External links
The Wey and Arun Canal Trust – walks along the Wey South Path

Footpaths in Surrey
Footpaths in West Sussex
Long-distance footpaths in England